"Thank You For Hearing Me" is a song by Irish singer-songwriter Sinéad O'Connor, released in 1994 as the first single from her fourth album, Universal Mother (1994). Co-written by her with John Reynolds and based on her recent breakup with English art pop singer Peter Gabriel, they also co-produced it with English musician, composer and record producer Tim Simenon. It received positive reviews from music critics and was a sizeable hit in Europe. In Iceland, the song peaked at number five, and was a top 10 hit also in Poland, while it peaked at number 13 in the UK and number 14 in Scotland.

Critical reception
J.D. Considine from The Baltimore Sun complimented the song as the "crowning glory" of Universal Mother, which with its "bone-simple melody and deep, hypnotic pulse, expresses a gratitude so heartfelt and self-effacing it seems more like a prayer than a song." Larry Flick from Billboard declared it as an "ethereal hip-hop track", adding that "it should intrigue those who prefer their pop with vigilant melodies and a smart passion." Steve Baltin from Cash Box called it one of "her best moments" on the album, and a "stunning conclusion". Later, on the single review, he described it as "passionate, emotive, firey, beautiful. This single is a wonderful reminder of why audiences fell in love with O'Connor before all the controversy. It conveys emotion with the sincerity only she can give, using a rising crescendo before slipping into a hushed whisper near the end." Michael R. Smith from The Daily Vault wrote that O'Connor "herself is left with a surprising feeling of appreciation, especially for those who had stood by her through it all, and she shows her gratitude with the inspiring closer". 

In his weekly UK chart commentary, James Masterton wrote that it "achieves almost hymn-like proportions with Sinead singing like the angel you always suspected she was. Exactly how commercial it will be remains to be seen, she has made spine-tingling records that have flopped in the past, but for the moment it is good to welcome her back to the heights." Pan-European magazine Music & Media commented, "Gloria in excelsis deo, Sinead is singing a prayer on a dance rhythm." Alan Jones from Music Week rated it four out of five, writing that "this is an odd track; it's very simple, extremely repetitive and almost hymnal in it quiet gentleness, apart from a sinewy bassline." He concluded with that "its success as a single is assured". Joy Press from Spin deemed it "a post-suicide-attempt song that hums with lush gratitude for life's little favors." David Yonke from Toledo Blade noted that the singer "offers an olive branch to those who have given her a chance."

Chart performance
The song charted in both Europe and Australia. In Iceland, it was a top 5 hit, peaking at number five in February 1995. In Poland, it peaked at number ten, while in the UK, it reached number 13 in November 1994. It entered the UK Singles Chart at number 18, and the last entry was at number 72 on 1 January 1995. In Scotland, the single peaked at number 14 in its first week on the Scottish Top 100. The last position was at number 92 on 22 January. On the Eurochart Hot 100, it reached its highest position as number 51 in December 1994. In Australia, it only reached number 114.

Music video
A music video was produced to promote "Thank You for Hearing Me", directed by British film director Richard Heslop. It was later published on YouTube in March 2012. The video had generated more than 1,3 million views as of December 2022.

Track listing
 Europe, CD maxi (1994)
"Thank You For Hearing Me" – 6:30
"Fire on Babylon" (Remix) – 13:27

Charts

External links
 Official video, YouTube

References

1994 singles
1994 songs
Chrysalis Records singles
Music videos directed by Richard Heslop
Sinéad O'Connor songs
Songs about heartache
Song recordings produced by Bomb the Bass
Song recordings produced by John Reynolds
Songs written by Sinéad O'Connor
Songs written by John Reynolds (musician)